Anolis ibanezi is a species of lizard in the family Dactyloidae. The species is found in Panama and Costa Rica.

References

Anoles
Reptiles of Panama
Reptiles of Costa Rica
Reptiles described in 2009